Khatsura (Khasuuri) is a rural locality (a settlement) in Zakamensky District, Republic of Buryatia, Russia. The population was 80 as of 2010. There are 2 streets.

Geography 
Khatsura is located 6 km south of Zakamensk (the district's administrative centre) by road. Zakamensk is the nearest rural locality.

References 

Rural localities in Zakamensky District